The UEFA qualifiers for the 2015 FIFA Beach Soccer World Cup was a beach soccer tournament which took place in Jesolo, Italy between 5–14 September 2014. The tournament served as the FIFA Beach Soccer World Cup qualifier for teams from UEFA, where the top four teams qualified for the 2015 FIFA Beach Soccer World Cup in Portugal.

This was the second time that the Beach Soccer World Cup qualifiers were held in Italy. All matches were played at the Beach Arena del Faro di Jesolo in the Lido di Jesolo beach area.

Participating teams and draw
The following 24 teams entered the tournament.

 (withdrew)

 (hosts)

The draw of the tournament was held on 18 July 2014 in Jesolo. The 24 teams were drawn into six groups of four teams for the first stage.

First stage
Each team earns three points for a win in regulation time, two points for a win in extra time, one point for a win in a penalty shoot-out, and no points for a defeat.

All times are local, Central European Summer Time (UTC+2).

Group A

Group B

Group C

Group D

Group E

Group F

Second stage

Group 1

Group 2

Group 3

Group 4

Final stage
The top team from each group in the second stage advance to the semi-finals to play for the title. The other teams eliminated from the second stage advance to classification play-offs (5th to 8th place, 9th to 12th place, 13th to 16th place) depending on their positions.

Play-offs for 13th to 16th place

Semi-finals for 13th to 16th place

Play-off for 15th place

Play-off for 13th place

Play-offs for 9th to 12th place

Semi-finals for 9th to 12th place

Play-off for 11th place

Play-off for 9th place

Play-offs for 5th to 8th place

Semi-finals for 5th to 8th place

Play-off for 7th place

Play-off for 5th place

Play-offs for 1st to 4th place

Semi-finals

Play-off for 3rd place

Final

Final ranking

References

External links

FIFA Beach Soccer World Cup 2015 - Europe Qualifier Jesolo, at Beach Soccer Worldwide
Squads
PDF reports: Day 1, Day 2, Day 3, Day 4, Day 5, Day 6, Day 7, Day 8, Day 9, Day 10.
FIFA Beach Soccer World Cup Portugal 2015 – Qualifiers – Europe, at FIFA.com

2014–15 in Italian football
Qualification Uefa
International association football competitions hosted by Italy
2015
2014 in beach soccer